The Oklahoma state elections were held on November 7, 2006. The primary election was held on July 25. The runoff primary election was held August 22. The 2006 elections marked the first time in 80 years that the Republican Party gained a majority of seats in the Oklahoma House of Representatives.

Overview

Executive Branch Before Election

Legislature Before Election

Executive Branch After Election

Legislature After Election

Governor

In the Democratic primary, incumbent Brad Henry defeated challenger Andrew Marr 86% to 14%. In the Republican primary, Ernest Istook defeated Bob Sullivan, Jim Williamson, and Sean Evanoff. Istook took 54.7% of the vote, Sullivan 31%, Williamson 9.8%, and Evanoff 4.6%.

In the general election, Henry defeated challenger Istook with 66% of the vote to remain in office for the next four years.

Lieutenant governor
With incumbent Mary Fallin not running for reelection as the Lieutenant Governor of Oklahoma, a new Lieutenant Governor was guaranteed.

Primary election
The candidates for the parties faced on in the primary election on July 25. If no party received more than 50% of the vote, a runoff election was held on August 22 to decide the winner.

Candidates
There were three candidates in the Republican primary for Lieutenant Governor.

There were four candidates in the Democratic primary for Lieutenant Governor.

General election
In the general election, Democratic primary winner Jari Askins faced the Republican primary winner Todd Hiett. Also, E. Z. Million ran as an Independent.

State Auditor and Inspector

Attorney general

State Treasurer

Superintendent of Public Instruction

Commissioner of Labor

Insurance Commissioner

Corporation Commissioner

U.S. Representatives

State Representatives

State Senate

Judicial

District Judges

Associate District Judges

State Questions

SQ 724
This measure amends Article V, Section 21 of the State Constitution. That Section deals with State pay to
legislators. The amendment restricts State pay to some legislators. The pay restriction would apply to some
legislators while in jail or prison. The pay restriction would apply to legislators found guilty of a crime. It would also apply to legislators who plead either guilty or no contest. Affected legislators must return any State pay received for time while in jail or prison.

For - 87.78% 
Against - 12.22%

SQ 725
This measure amends the State Constitution. It amends Section 23 of Article 10. The measure deals with the
Constitutional Reserve Fund also known as the Rainy Day Fund. The measure allows money to be spent
from the Rainy Day Fund. The purpose of the authorized spending is to retain employment for state residents
by helping at-risk manufacturers. Payments from the Fund would be used to encourage such manufacturers
to make investments in Oklahoma. All such payments from the Fund must be unanimously approved by three
State officers. Those officers are the Governor and the head of the Senate and House of Representatives.
Those officers could only approve payments recommended by an independent committee. Such spending
is allowed in years when there is Eighty Million Dollars or more in the Fund and other conditions are met.
Such spending is limited to Ten Million Dollars a year. The help given to a manufacturer is limited to ten
percent of its in-State capital investments. The Legislature could make laws to carry out the amendment.

For - 53.58% 
Against - 46.42%

SQ 733
This measure amends the Oklahoma Constitution. It amends Article 28. This Article deals with sales of
alcoholic beverages. Section 6 of Article 28 bans the sale of alcoholic beverages by package stores on certain
days. Package store sales of these beverages are prohibited on election days while the polls are open. This
measure would remove the ban on sales on election days. If this measure passes, package stores could sell
alcoholic beverages on election days.

For - 52.52% 
Against - 47.48%

SQ 734
This measure amends the Oklahoma Constitution. It amends Section 6A of Article 10. This section provides
an exemption from property tax. The exemption applies to goods that are shipped into the state, but which
do not remain in the state for more than ninety days. This is sometimes known as the freeport exemption.
This measure would allow laws to be enacted. The laws could provide for an application process to claim
this exemption. The laws could require the application to be filed by a certain date. The laws could require
certain information to be included with the application. The application would be filed with the county
assessor.

For - 63.10% 
Against - 36.90%

See also
Government of Oklahoma
Oklahoma House of Representatives
Oklahoma Senate
Politics of Oklahoma
Oklahoma Congressional Districts

References

External links
Oklahoma State Election Board

 
Oklahoma